Uqi Chaka (Aymara uqi brown, grey-brown, chaka bridge, "grey-brown bridge", also spelled Okhe Chaca) is a mountain in the Bolivian Andes which reaches a height of approximately . It is located in the La Paz Department, Loayza Province, Luribay Municipality. Uqi Chaka lies northeast of Qillwan Quta at the road which connects Patacamaya (Patak Amaya) and Luribay.

References 

Mountains of La Paz Department (Bolivia)